This is a list of Berber-language television channels.

Morocco

State 
Tamazight TV (Shilha, Central Tamazight, Riffian, Standard Moroccan Tamazight)
2M TV partially in Shilha
Arrabia partially in Shilha, Central Tamazight, Riffian

Algeria

State 
TV4 (Kabyle, Shawiya and other Algerian Berber languages)

Private 
Berbère Télévision (Kabyle) – based in France
TQ5 TV (Kabyle) – based in Canada

Niger

State
Télé Sahel – partially in Tamajeq

Spain

State
Televisión Melilla – partially in Riffian

See also

 Lists of television channels
 Media of Morocco
 Media of Algeria

Berber languages
Lists of television channels by language
Television stations in Morocco